Franco Tomás Quiroga (born 23 November 1986 in Cutral Có, Neuquén) is an Argentine football midfielder who plays for Tristán Suárez.

Career
Quiroga started his playing career in 2005 with Club Atlético Temperley in the regionalised third division of Argentine football.

In 2006, he joined Olimpo de Bahía Blanca where he was part of the squad that won back to back championships to secure promotion to the Argentine Primera. Quiroga missed out on the opportunity to play in the Primera when he joined Nueva Chicago.

In 2008, he joined Argentinos Juniors where he made his debut in the Primera on 16 August in a 4–1 win over Vélez Sársfield. He got his first taste of international club football playing a number of games in the Copa Sudamericana 2008 where Argentinos reached the semi-finals.

In 2010, he joined Chilean club Santiago Wanderers on the recommendation of Argentinos manager Claudio Borghi.

Honours

References

External links
 Sports Ya profile 
 Argentine Primera statistics at Fútbol XXI 
 

1986 births
Living people
Argentine footballers
Argentine expatriate footballers
People from Neuquén Province
Association football midfielders
Olimpo footballers
Nueva Chicago footballers
Argentinos Juniors footballers
Independiente Rivadavia footballers
Santiago Wanderers footballers
San Martín de San Juan footballers
Atlético Tucumán footballers
CSyD Tristán Suárez footballers
Argentine Primera División players
Primera Nacional players
Argentine expatriate sportspeople in Chile
Expatriate footballers in Chile